Okhai Michael Akhigbe  (29 September 1946 – 13 October 2013) was a Vice admiral of the Nigerian Navy who served as de facto Vice President of Nigeria (as Chief of General Staff) under military head of state General Abdusalami Abubakar from June 1998 to May 1999, when the military government was terminated and replaced with the Fourth Nigerian Republic. He previously served as Chief of Naval Staff, the highest-ranking officer of the Nigerian Navy from 1994 to 1998; Military Governor of Lagos State from 1986 to 1988; and Military Governor of Ondo State from 1985 to 1986.

Early life
Akhigbe was born on September 29, 1946, in Fugar, Aviawu clan in Etsako Central Local Government Area of Edo State. and was educated at Afenmai Anglican Grammar School, Igarra from 1961 to 1965.

Military career 
He attended the Nigerian Defence Academy, Royal Naval School of Maritime Operations Dryad, Southwick UK, Command and Staff College Jaji, National Institute for Policy and Strategic Studies Kuru, University of Poitiers, Rouan, France, and the International Defense Management Program at the Naval Postgraduate School, in California, United States.

He was the Principal Welfare Officer of the Nigerian Navy Flagship NNS Aradu, Military Governor of Lagos and Ondo States, Director, Naval Plans, Naval Headquarters, Flag Officer commanding the Easter Naval Command and Chief of Naval Staff.

Chief of General Staff 
In 1998 he became the Chief of General Staff and Vice President of Nigeria. Admiral Okhai Michael Akhigbe is remembered for his numerous services to his community and nation, especially his role during the transition from military to civilian rule in 1999 when he was the Chief of General Staff to Gen. Abdusalami Abubakar.

Later career 
Akhigbe was an Attorney with specialization in Maritime Law. He was also a seasoned businessman with substantial investments in real estate.  He died in the US on 28 October 2013.

Honours 
He was awarded the honour of the Grand Commander of the Order of the Niger (GCON), in 1998 and an honorary doctorate by the University of Benin in 2003. His military decorations include Force Service Star, Meritorious Service Star, and Defense Service Star.

Community development 
Akhigbe brought electricity to the Fugar community. He brought the administrative headquarters of Etsako Central Local Government Area of Edo State Nigeria to Fugar City. He was the single most important factor in the rehabilitation of the Teacher's college Ekiti, later called Ondo State College of Education. Admiral Akhigbe, then a Commodore and military Governor of old Ondo State approved the appointment of USAID-HARVARD trained educationist, Dr Sam Adebayo Adewuya as the Sole Administrator of the college with the sole command of returning the dilapidated college to functional level within three years. The college has since evolved into the University of Education, Ekiti State TUNEDIK.

References

Vice presidents of Nigeria
2013 deaths
1945 births
Governors of Lagos State
Governors of Ondo State
Nigerian Navy admirals
Nigerian Defence Academy alumni
20th-century Nigerian politicians
Chiefs of Naval Staff (Nigeria)